The Inokashira Park dismemberment incident is an unsolved murder in Japan that happened in April 1994. The statute of limitations passed for this incident in 2009.

History
In the morning of April 23, 1994, in a trash can in Inokashira Park in Tokyo, a park worker discovered two hands, two feet, a right shoulder, an ankle and scattered pieces of flesh and bone, totaling 24 pieces of a human body, in a waste disposal bag. The head, chest, and genitals have never been found.

The body was determined to be that of a top-class architect “S” (age 35), who was last seen alive at roughly 10PM on the previous evening. Unconfirmed reports claimed that someone resembling "S" was accosted by two men around midnight on April 23, and two men entered the park around 4:00AM on April 23.

The body was cut into 20-centimeter pieces using an electric saw, and the muscle was carefully cut away. After this, the body was carefully washed and drained of all its blood; this would require the skills of a highly trained medical doctor. The body was not battered and there were no traces of drugs, so the cause of death could not be determined. There were slight traces of internal bleeding in the muscle, indicating that the man may have been cut while still alive.

Investigation
Every friend and acquaintance of "S" was interviewed at length, and his room was thoroughly searched, but neither evidence nor testimony could be obtained. Eleven months later, many officers from the investigative team were recruited to investigate the sarin gas attack on the Tokyo subway. In 2009 the statute of limitations expired.

See also
List of unsolved murders

References
 週刊朝日 未解決事件ファイル 真犯人に告ぐ. Tokyo: 朝日新聞出版, 2010.

1994 murders in Japan
April 1994 events in Asia
History of Tokyo
Male murder victims
Unsolved murders in Japan